The Volkswagen D24T engine is a 2.4-litre inline-six-cylinder (R6/I6) single overhead camshaft (SOHC) diesel engine, formerly manufactured by Volkswagen Group from December 1982 to July 1992.

Technical description
The engine is constructed in an identical manner to the earlier Volkswagen D24 engine, but includes a turbocharger for improved performance. The engine head is modified compared to a naturally aspirated engine. The valve zone is not flat anymore but slightly hemispheric. The engine block is equipped with oil squirters (with pressure valve) for better cooling of the pistons. The pistons are modified on the skirt zone to not interfere with the oil squirters during the strokes. The injection pump (bosch VE) is adapted to the turbo system.

Applications
Volkswagen LT (DV: 12/82-07/92, 1G: 08/88-07/89)
Volvo 740
Volvo 760 and 780
Volvo 940
Volvo 960

See also
List of Volkswagen Group diesel engines
List of discontinued Volkswagen Group diesel engines
Turbocharged Direct Injection

References

External links
Volkswagen Group corporate website
Chemnitz (Germany) - engine plant Mobility and Sustainability
Kassel (Germany) - engine plant Mobility and Sustainability
Salzgitter (Germany) - engine plant Mobility and Sustainability
Polkowice (Poland) - engine plant Mobility and Sustainability
São Carlos (Brazil) - engine plant Mobility and Sustainability
Shanghai (China) - engine plant Mobility and Sustainability

D24T
D24T
Diesel engines by model
Straight-six engines